James MacKrell (October 12, 1937) is a retired American television personality, best known for emceeing television game shows such as Celebrity Sweepstakes and The Game Game. He was born in Little Rock, Arkansas.  Published variations of his name include James MacKrell, Jim McKrell, and James McKrell.

Show business career
Jim McKrell's broadcast career spanned five decades. McKrell was the host and star of the hit NBC game show Celebrity Sweepstakes. He also hosted The Game Game, Quiz Kids, plus several unsold game show pilots. He also was the announcer for the game shows Sweethearts, in 1988, and Couch Potatoes, in 1989. McKrell's career spanned all areas of television and movies. His theatrical credits include such memorable films as Woody Allen's Annie Hall (1977), Albert Brooks's Defending Your Life (1991) Semi-Tough (1978), Teen Wolf (1985) with Michael J. Fox and Harry's War (1981). McKrell also played TV news reporter Lew Landers in two movies directed by Joe Dante, The Howling (1981) and Gremlins (1984), and had guest starring roles on television in Dallas, Soap, Moonlighting and The Golden Girls among over 40 others. His made-for-TV movies include Christmas Miracle in Caufield, U.S.A. (1977), Walk Don't Run and A Reason to Live (1985). McKrell was also a regular on General Hospital, Capitol, Generations and Days of Our Lives.

McKrell made advertising a major focal point of his career. He was a corporate spokesman for companies including Chevrolet and Disney. He starred in spots for household names such as Whirlpool, Fiber Con, Serta, Goodyear, Mattel, Oster, Radio Shack, Entex, and more. He also appeared as a spokesman for industrial and corporate films for Toyota, Exxon, Xerox, Shell, Coca-Cola, and others. For 14 years, McKrell was the corporate host for the National Easter Seals Telethon, and he wrote and produced several projects for ACTA Communications in Chicago. He also did a good share of television informercials.

A veteran of radio, his credits include some of the top radio stations in the nation including KMPC and KFI Los Angeles, WMEX in Boston, WNOE in New Orleans, KBOX in Dallas, KXOL in Fort Worth (under the on-air name, Jimmy Kaye, where he worked with longtime friend George Carlin), and WFUN Miami. He hosted a top-rated talk show in Houston, Texas on KKTL, and was a news anchor at KHTV Channel 39 in Houston.

Jim's father, Rev. James K. "Uncle Mac" MacKrell, Sr., was a radio personality on KCUL radio station in Fort Worth, Texas.

After show business
In retirement, McKrell continued to take on voiceover projects until 2009 including the movie Imps. He lived near Conroe, Texas.

MacKrell published a novel, Down from the Mountain: the Story of Bandit and the Wolf.

References

External links 
 
 History of KBOX Radio in Dallas

1937 births
Living people
American male film actors
American male soap opera actors
American game show hosts
American male voice actors
Game show announcers
Male actors from Little Rock, Arkansas